The St Mary-le-Bow public debates were recorded between 1964-1979 at the St Mary-le-Bow Church, London, and feature well-known public figures debating important issues of the time.

Description 
The recordings were made every Tuesday lunchtime at 1pm, with the speakers invited by the rector of the church, Joseph McCulloch. The recordings are held by the British Library as part of the Archival Sound Recordings.

Participants 
The public debates include interviews with:
 Enoch Powell on race
 Diana Rigg on single parentage
 A. J. Ayer on moral responsibility
 Edna O’Brien on fear
 Germaine Greer on free will
 Peter Cook, comedian and broadcaster, talking about the Devil
 Billie Whitelaw, actress, on various topics including life.

Only a small representative sample of recordings from this collection is available at present.

References 

British Library collections